
Year 708 (DCCVIII) was a leap year starting on Sunday (link will display the full calendar) of the Julian calendar. The denomination 708 for this year has been used since the early medieval period, when the Anno Domini calendar era became the prevalent method in Europe for naming years.

Events 
 By place 
 Byzantine Empire 
 Arab–Byzantine War: The Umayyads under Maslamah ibn Abd al-Malik capture and sack the Byzantine city of Tyana (Cappadocia) after a prolonged siege, and following a victory over a Byzantine relief army. Maslamah also leads another expedition in the summer, raiding and conquering Amorium (modern Turkey).

 Europe 
 Battle of Anchialus: A Byzantine expeditionary force under Emperor Justinian II is defeated near the seaside city of Anchialus, on the Black Sea Coast. The Byzantines are overwhelmed by a surprise attack of Bulgarian cavalry, led by Tervel. Justinian manages to reach the fortress, and escapes to Constantinople on a ship.

 Asia 
 Nazaktar Khan, a Turk Shahi prince in alliance with the Tibetan Empire, captures Bactria from the Umayyads.
 August 29 – Copper coins are minted in Japan for the first time (Traditional Japanese date: August 10, 708).

 By topic 
 Medicine 
 Tea drinking gains popularity among the Chinese. It is also valued for its alleged medicinal values (approximate date).

 Religion 
 January 15 – Pope Sisinnius succeeds Pope John VII as the 87th pope.
 March 25 – Pope Constantine I succeeds Pope Sisinnius as the 88th pope.
 Island Mont Tombe is dedicated to Michael and renamed Mont Saint-Michel.

Births 
 Theudoald, mayor of the palace of Austrasia (or 707)
 Yuthog Yontan Gonpo, Tibetan high priest (lama) (d. 833)

Deaths 
 February 4 – Sisinnius, pope of the Catholic Church 
 June 5 – Jacob of Edessa, Syriac writer
 Abd-Allah ibn Ibadh, Muslim jurist and imam
 Drogo, duke of Champagne (b. 670)
 Julian II the Roman, Syriac Orthodox Patriarch of Antioch.

References